This Millie Jackson album, A Moment's Pleasure became another success effort, peaking at #47 on the Top R&B/Hip-Hop Albums #144 on The Billboard 200 chart. Includes the hits "Never Change Lovers In The Middle of the Night", "Kiss You All Over" and the title track.

Track listing
 "Never Change Lovers In The Middle of the Night" (Keith Forsey, Mats Björklund)
 "Seeing You Again" (Brad Shapiro, Millie Jackson)
 "Kiss You All Over" (Mike Chapman, Nicky Chinn)
 "A Moment's Pleasure" (George Jackson)
 "What Went Wrong Last Night Pt.1" (Brad Shapiro, Millie Jackson)
 "What Went Wrong Last Night Pt.2" (Brad Shapiro, Millie Jackson)
 "Rising Cost of Love" (Bobby Martin, Zane Grey, Len Ron Hanks)
 "We Got To Hit It Off" (Benny Latimore)
 "Once You've Had It" (Brad Shapiro, Millie Jackson)

Personnel
Brad Shapiro, Millie Jackson, The Muscle Shoals Sound Band - rhythm arrangements
David Van DePitte - string and horn arrangements
Brandye - backing vocals

Charts

Singles

References

External links
 Millie Jackson-A Moment's Pleasure at Discogs

1979 albums
Millie Jackson albums
Albums produced by Brad Shapiro
Spring Records albums